For Those Who Don't Read Me is a Canadian drama film, directed by Yan Giroux and released in 2018. Loosely inspired by the life of Québécois poet , the film stars Martin Dubreuil as Boisvert and depicts the effect that his life as a struggling writer has on his relationship with his girlfriend Dyane Gagnon (Céline Bonnier) and her son Marc (Henri Picard).

The film received three Canadian Screen Award nominations at the 7th Canadian Screen Awards, and 12 Prix Iris nominations at the 21st Quebec Cinema Awards.

Accolades

References

External links
 
 

2018 films
2018 drama films
Canadian drama films
Quebec films
French-language Canadian films
2010s Canadian films